Michalis Demetriou (born August 23, 1986) is a former Cypriot footballer. He previously played for Apollon Limassol. After failing to appear in any competitive matches for Apollon Limassol, he moved to APOP Kinyras Peyias.

External links

1986 births
Living people
Cypriot footballers
Apollon Limassol FC players
APOP Kinyras FC players
AEK Larnaca FC players
Nea Salamis Famagusta FC players
Association football midfielders